Nigel Caple is a British artist and lecturer.

Nigel Caple was born on the Isle of Wight. He studied art at Portsmouth College of Art and the Department of Fine Art at Portsmouth Polytechnic (now the University of Portsmouth), where he received a BA Honours Degree in Fine Art.

While at Portsmouth Polytechnic he studied with the painter Miles Richmond. After graduation he continued to be tutored by Richmond at various locations including Ronda in Spain, Morley College in London and The Motor House in North Yorkshire. Caple's relationship with Richmond continued until Richmond's death in 2008.

Between 1987 and 1988 Caple worked on a series of paintings and drawings based upon Ryde Pier on the Isle of Wight.

In 1988, Caple began painting and drawing the historic Shinjo Matsuri Festival of Northern Japan. These drawings and paintings culminated in a touring exhibition that was part of the UK's Japan Festival 1991.

In 1992, he was invited by cultural authorities in Japan to create and coordinate an exhibition. The subsequent show was entitled An Exhibition of Works by Eight British Artists (1919-1992). The exhibition was held in Northern Japan.

From 1996 to 1999, Caple helped conceive and coordinate a group show called Bridges. This was The Daiwa Foundation's Anglo-Japanese Visual Arts Touring Show, which toured the UK, Europe and Japan.

Caple travelled along the Tōkaidō Road in Japan between 1998 and 2000 in order to make drawings of the views once used by Utagawa Hiroshige in his woodblock series entitled The Fifty-three Stations of the Tōkaidō. These drawings formed the basis for a series of paintings and culminated in a touring exhibition and a lecture series during 2001–2002. Locations included Hertfordshire University and The British Museum. The exhibition was part of the UK's Japan Festival 2001. His lecture on the Tokaido given in 2013 for The Japan Society was subsequently published as an article in The Japan Society's Proceedings publication.

He has taken part in numerous solo and group exhibitions and has received support from both public and commercial sponsors for his painting projects, including The Daiwa Anglo-Japanese Foundation, The Corporation of London and Mitsubishi Electric.

His paintings are held in public collections in Britain and Japan. Works in private collections are in the UK, France, Germany, America and Japan.

Caple teaches and lectures in London.

References

External links 

 Nigel Caple | website
 Miles Richmond | website
 University of Hertfordshire Galleries | New Exhibitions of Contemporary Art website

Further reading 

 Matthi Forrer: Hiroshige Prints and Drawings. (Prestel: 1997). .
 Richard Cork: David Bomberg. (Yale University Press: 1988). .
 Roy Oxlade: David Bomberg 1890–1957. Patronage and Teaching 1913–1945; The Approach to Painting. (Royal College of Art, London: 1977). .
 William Lipke: David Bomberg. A critical study of his life and work. (Evelyn, Adams and Mackay Ltd. London: 1967). BNB GB6711107.
 Nigel Caple: The Tokaido Road. (The Japan Society Proceedings, Number 150, 2013). ISSN 0952-2050.

20th-century English painters
English male painters
21st-century English painters
Stations of the Tōkaidō
Living people
Year of birth missing (living people)
20th-century English male artists
21st-century English male artists